The 1985 Lipton International Players Championships was a tennis tournament played on outdoor hard courts. It was the 1st edition of the Miami Masters and was part of the 1985 Nabisco Grand Prix and the 1984 Virginia Slims World Championship Series. Both the men's and the women's events took place at Laver's International Tennis Resort in Delray Beach, Florida from February 4 through February 18, 1985.

Prize money

*per team

Finals

Men's singles

 Tim Mayotte defeated  Scott Davis 4–6, 4–6, 6–3, 6–2, 6–4
 It was Mayotte's only title of the year and the 2nd of his career.

Women's singles

 Martina Navratilova defeated  Chris Evert-Lloyd 6–2, 6–4
 It was Navratilova's 2nd singles title of the year and the 101st of her career.

Men's doubles

 Paul Annacone /  Christo van Rensburg defeated  Sherwood Stewart /  Kim Warwick 7–5, 7–5, 6–4
 It was Annacone's 1st title of the year and the 2nd of his career. It was van Rensburg's 1st title of the year and the 3rd of his career.

Women's doubles
 Gigi Fernández /  Martina Navratilova defeated  Kathy Jordan /  Hana Mandlíková 7–6(7–4), 6–2
 It was Fernández's 1st title of the year and the 1st of her career. It was Navratilova's 1st title of the year and the 202nd of her career.

Mixed doubles
 Heinz Günthardt /  Martina Navratilova defeated  Mike Bauer /  Catherine Tanvier 6–2, 6–2

Notes

References

External links 
 ATP Tournament Profile
 WTA Tournament Profile

 
Lipton International Players Championships
Miami Open (tennis)
Lipton International Players Championships
Lipton International Players Championships
Lipton International Players Championships
Lipton International Players Championships